Ashburton was a borough constituency represented in the House of Commons of the Parliament at Westminster, for the Parliaments of 1295 and 1407, and regularly from 1640 until it was abolished for the 1868 general election. It was one of three Devon borough constituencies newly enfranchised (or re-enfranchised after a gap of centuries) in the Long Parliament. It returned two Members of Parliament until the 1832 general election when the number was reduced to one MP.

From the 1885 general election Ashburton was revived as a county division of Devon. It returned one member until it was abolished from the 1918 general election.

Boundaries

1885-1918
The Sessional Divisions of Crockernwell and Teignbridge.

Members of Parliament

Ashburton borough 1398–1868

1407 Richard Hurston, Walter Denys

Ashburton re-enfranchised by Parliament in Nov 1640

MPs 1640–1832

MPs 1832–1868

Mid or Ashburton division of Devon 1885–1918

Elections

Elections in the 1830s

Arbuthnot resigned by accepting the office of Steward of the Chiltern Hundreds, causing a by-election.

Elections in the 1840s

Jardine's death caused a by-election.

Elections in the 1850s

Elections in the 1860s

Elections in the 1880s

Elections in the 1890s

Elections in the 1900s

Elections in the 1910s

General Election 1914–15:

Another General Election was required to take place before the end of 1915. The political parties had been making preparations for an election to take place and by the July 1914, the following candidates had been selected; 
Unionist: Ernest Morrison-Bell
Liberal:

References

 Robert Beatson, "A Chronological Register of Both Houses of Parliament" (London: Longman, Hurst, Res & Orme, 1807) 
 D Brunton & D H Pennington, Members of the Long Parliament (London: George Allen & Unwin, 1954)
 F W S Craig, "British Parliamentary Election Results 1832–1885" (2nd edition, Aldershot: Parliamentary Research Services, 1989)
 J Holladay Philbin, Parliamentary Representation 1832 – England and Wales (New Haven: Yale University Press, 1965)
 British History Online – list of speakers in the Parliaments of 1656 and 1658-9

Parliamentary constituencies in Devon (historic)
Constituencies of the Parliament of the United Kingdom established in 1640
Constituencies of the Parliament of the United Kingdom disestablished in 1868
Constituencies of the Parliament of the United Kingdom established in 1885
Constituencies of the Parliament of the United Kingdom disestablished in 1918
Teignbridge